Horrel Hill is an unincorporated community in Lower Richland County, South Carolina, United States. Situated south of Fort Jackson and northwest of McEntire Joint National Guard Base, it is centered at approximately the intersection of Garner's Ferry Road (U.S. Route 76/378) and Harmon Road/Horrel Hill Road (SC 86). Congaree Road (SC 769) meets Garner's Ferry Road about 120 meters to the east.

History
Settled in the 1770s, and originally called Meyer's (or Myer's) Hill, it was site of the county courthouse of Richland County from 1785 to 1799. When the county seat was transferred to the new city of Columbia, the courthouse was then used for a grammar school.

A number of different names were applied to the area or parts of the area, including Minervaville. Eventually it came to be named for plantation owner Thomas Horrell.

Just before noon on April 30, 1924, Horrell Hill was struck by the F4 Horrell Hill Tornado, the worst in the state's history. Running for 135 miles, it killed 67 people, including 24 in Horrell Hill. Four children died in Horrell Hill Elementary School when the storm demolished it.

Today Horrell Hill has two schools, Horrell Hill Elementary School and Southeast Middle School, operated by Richland County School District One.

References

External links
Horrell Hill Elementary School website

Unincorporated communities in South Carolina
Unincorporated communities in Richland County, South Carolina
Columbia metropolitan area (South Carolina)